Punk rap is hip hop music influenced by the rebellious ethos, and sometimes musical characteristics, of punk rock. The genre has been described as being influenced by styles such as trap music, punk rock, heavy metal and lo-fi music.

One of the earliest proponents of the scene was Odd Future, due to their merging of hip hop and shock humor.  In an article for the BBC, journalist Thomas Hobbs referred to the rise of the genre as being a rebellion against the politics of the period, with artists showing disdain for topics such as Brexit, the presidency of Donald Trump and global warming.

Characteristics

Vocals and structure
Some artists makes use of sonic elements of punk rock, such as screaming, whereas others make use of its attitude and melodic style.
Vulture online described its origins as "the product of a convergence between Atlanta trap and the devilish eclecticism of Miami predecessors like SpaceGhostPurrp". Lil Jon's harsh style of vocalization has also been cited as influence on the development of the genre.

 
In a way hardcore punk was a "radical departure" from alternative and popular music of that era for the fact it was played "louder and harder," "wasn't verse-chorus rock," and "dispelled any notion of what songwriting is supposed to be [and] it's its own form" punk rap songs share some of the  "unorthodox" characteristics. They are "short, repetitive, wrapped in distortion and grimly effective.”

See also
 List of punk rap artists

References

Hip hop genres
Rap
Rap rock
Fusion music genres
21st-century music genres
American rock music genres
American styles of music